Paul D. Corderman (born September 1, 1977) is an American politician from Maryland and a member of the Republican Party. He is a member of the Maryland Senate from District 2, which covers parts of Washington County, assuming office on September 1, 2020. He was a member of the Maryland House of Delegates from District 2B from December 2017 to August 2020.

Early life
Corderman was born on September 1, 1977, in Hagerstown, Maryland to John P. Corderman, a member of the Maryland Senate and circuit court judge. He attended North Hagerstown High School. He graduated from the University of Maryland with a Bachelor of Arts in criminal justice in 2000.

Career
In December 2017, Gov. Larry Hogan appointed Corderman to the Maryland House of Delegates to replace Brett Wilson whom Hogan appointed to the Circuit Court for Washington County. Corderman was elected to the seat in November 2018. He served from December 20, 2017, to August 28, 2020; resigning on August 31, 2020. In 2020, Hogan appointed Corderman to the Maryland Senate on the resignation of Andrew A. Serafini. He started his term on September 1, 2020.

Corderman is currently the Republican nominee for his Senate seat. Unopposed in the Republican primary, he will face Democrat Shawn Demetrious Perry in the 2022 general election.

Election results
2018 Race for Maryland House of Delegates – District 2B
Voters to choose one:
{| class="wikitable"
|-
!Name
!Votes
!Percent
!Outcome
|-
|-
|Paul D. Corderman, Rep.
|5,457
|  51.9%
|   Won
|-
|-
|Peter E. Perini, Sr., Dem.
|5,028
|  47.8%
|   Lost
|-
|-
|Other Write-Ins
|25
|  0.2%
|   Lost
|}

Personal life
Corderman is married and has one child.

References

Republican Party members of the Maryland House of Delegates
Republican Party Maryland state senators
Living people
1977 births
Politicians from Hagerstown, Maryland
21st-century American politicians
Maryland city council members